Cootie Stark (December 27, 1927 – April 14, 2005) was an American Piedmont blues guitarist, singer, and songwriter. His best remembered recordings were "Metal Bottoms" and "Sandyland." Stark was known as the 'King of the Piedmont blues.'

Biography
He was born Johnny Miller, in Abbeville, South Carolina, United States, the son of sharecroppers, and grew up in Anderson County. Stark was given his first guitar by his father at the age of 14, having then relocated to Greenville, South Carolina.  His poor eyesight meant that he was unable to find regular employment.  He began busking on street corners, and learned his art from fellow street performers such as Peg Leg Sam, Pink Anderson and Josh White plus, particularly in his earliest days, from Baby Tate.  He acquired the nickname, Sugar Man, and continued to work his trade as a songster in the area. His performing name of Cootie Stark was an amalgam of a childhood nickname and his grandfather's surname.

His eyesight deteriorated until he was legally registered as blind, but Stark continued to perform across the State and beyond, often using the name Blind Johnny Miller. However, by the 1980s, with playing prospects diminishing, Stark settled in Greenville. "By then, the real Piedmont blues was pretty much gone," he stated. "All them guys were dead and gone and I wasn't making no headway." In 1997, when Stark was over seventy years old, he was heard playing Fats Domino songs by Tim Duffy, the founder of the Music Maker Relief Foundation.  Their record label released Stark's debut album, Sugar Man, in 1999. In 2003, Stark released his second and final album, Raw Sugar, when he was again accompanied on record by Taj Mahal.  He received the South Carolina Folk Heritage Award in 2005.

Stark died at the age of 77, in Greenville, in April 2005.

Discography

Solo albums

Guest appearances

See also
List of Piedmont blues musicians

References

1927 births
2005 deaths
American blues guitarists
American male guitarists
American blues singers
Songwriters from South Carolina
Singers from South Carolina
People from Abbeville, South Carolina
Piedmont blues musicians
Songster musicians
20th-century American singers
20th-century American guitarists
Guitarists from South Carolina
20th-century American male singers
American male songwriters